The GBU-57A/B  Massive Ordnance Penetrator (MOP) is a precision-guided,  "bunker buster" bomb used by the United States Air Force. This is substantially larger than the deepest-penetrating bunker busters previously available, the  GBU-28 and GBU-37.

It is designed to accomplish a difficult, complicated mission of reaching and destroying an adversary's weapons of mass destruction located in well-protected facilities.

Development
In 2002, Northrop Grumman and Lockheed Martin were working on the development of a  earth-penetrating weapon, but funding and technical difficulties resulted in the development work being abandoned. Following the 2003 invasion of Iraq, analysis of sites that had been attacked with bunker buster bombs revealed poor penetration and inadequate levels of destruction. This renewed interest in the development of a larger bunker buster, and the MOP project was initiated by the Defense Threat Reduction Agency to fulfill a long-standing Air Force requirement.

The U.S. Air Force has not officially communicated a specific military requirement for an ultra-large bomb, but it does have a concept for a collection of very large penetrator and blast weapons: the so-called "Big BLU" collection, which includes the MOAB (Massive Ordnance Air Blast) bomb. Development of the MOP was performed at the Air Force Research Laboratory, Munitions Directorate, Eglin Air Force Base, Florida with design and testing work performed by Boeing. It is intended that the bomb will be deployed on the B-2 bomber, and will be guided using GPS.  It is also planned to be deployed on the B-21 bomber.

Northrop Grumman announced a $2.5-million stealth-bomber refit contract on 19 July 2007. Each of the U.S. Air Force's B-2s is to be able to carry two 14-ton MOPs.

The initial explosive test of MOP took place on 14 March 2007 in a tunnel belonging to the Defense Threat Reduction Agency (DTRA) at the White Sands Missile Range, New Mexico.

On 6 October 2009, ABC News reported that the Pentagon had requested and obtained permission from the U.S. Congress to shift funding in order to accelerate the project. It was later announced by the U.S. military that funding delays and enhancements to the planned test schedule meant the bomb would not be deployable until December 2010, six months later than the original availability date.

The project has had at least one successful Flight Test MOP launch.

On 7 April 2011, the USAF ordered eight MOPs plus supporting equipment, for $28 million.

The Air Force took delivery of 20 bombs, designed to be delivered by the B-2 bomber, in September 2011. In February 2012, Congress approved $81.6 million to further develop and improve the weapon.

On 14 November 2011, Bloomberg reported that the Air Force Global Strike Command started receiving the Massive Ordnance Penetrator and that the deliveries "will meet requirements for the current operational need". The Air Force now has received delivery of 16 MOPs as of November 2011. And as of March 2012, there is an "operational stockpile" at Whiteman Air Force Base.

In 2012, the Pentagon requested $82 million to develop greater penetration power for the existing weapon. A 2013 report stated that the development had been a success, and B-2 integration testing began that year.

Next Generation Penetrator munition
On 25 June 2010, USAF Lt. Gen. Philip M. Breedlove said that the Next Generation Penetrator (NGP) munition should be about a third the size of the Massive Ordnance Penetrator so it could be carried by affordable aircraft. In December 2010, the USAF had a Broad Agency Announcement (BAA) for the Next Generation Penetrator.

Global Strike Command has indicated that one of the objectives for the Next-Generation Bomber is for it to carry a weapon with the effects of the Massive Ordnance Penetrator. This would either be with the same weapon or a smaller weapon that uses rocket power, not unlike the WW II British/American Disney bomb used, to reach sufficient speed to match the penetrating power of the larger weapon.

One of the current limitations of the MOP is that it lacks a void-sensing fuze and will therefore detonate only after it has come to a stop, even if it has passed the target area.

Specifications
 Length: 
 Diameter: 
 Weight: 
 Penetration:

See also
 Bunker buster
 Earthquake bomb
 Thermobaric weapon
Specific large bombs
 BLU-82 Daisy Cutter bomb
 Father of All Bombs (FOAB)
 GBU-43/B MOAB
 Grand Slam (bomb)
 T-12 Cloudmaker
 Tallboy (bomb)

References

External links

Massive Ordnance Penetrator Fact Sheet —dtra.mil
First Massive Ordnance Penetrator Explosive Test Successful—dtra.mil
Boeing-Developed Massive Ordnance Penetrator Successfully Completes Static Lethality Test—Boeing
'Bunker busters' may grow to 30,000 pounds—CNN
Massive bomb to MOP up deeply buried targets—Jane's Defence Weekly
A different kind of smart: weapons becoming autonomous and precise—Jane's
Massive Ordnance Penetrator (MOP)—GlobalSecurity.org
MOPping Up: The USA's 30,000 Pound Bomb
Kennedy-Feinstein Amendment to the Defense Authorization Bill on the Robust Nuclear Earth Penetrator (RNEP)
Rare image of a B-2 stealth bomber and its Massive Ordnance Penetrator bunker buster bomb

Anti-fortification weapons
Guided bombs of the United States
Boeing
Military equipment introduced in the 2010s